Harper Polling is an American polling and media company.

Overview
The organization was founded after the 2012 presidential election, with the goal of giving Republicans high-volume, inexpensive "robo-polling." The organization was founded by Brock McCleary, who had served as the polling director of the NRCC in the 2012 cycle. The organization was founded with the goal of emulating PPP, a left-leaning polling organization. Harper Polling has received some backlash for not being able to call cellphones.

Polling topics
Harper Polling correctly polled the 2013 Senate special election in Massachusetts. Harper has also polled the 2014 Pennsylvania Lieutenant Governor race and the 2014 Pennsylvania gubernatorial election.

In addition to polling elections, Harper Polling also polls for issues. Harper Polling partnered with PPP to conduct polling across 29 states to test support for the Gang of Eight's immigration reform bill.

References

External links
Harper Polling website

Public opinion research companies in the United States
American companies established in 2012
2012 establishments in Pennsylvania